Kyle Eckel (born December 30, 1981) is a former American football fullback who played in the National Football League. He was signed by the New England Patriots as an undrafted free agent in 2005 and won Super Bowl XLIV with the New Orleans Saints, beating the Indianapolis Colts. He played college football at Navy.

Eckel was also a member of the Miami Dolphins and Philadelphia Eagles.

Early life and education

Eckel attended Holy Spirit School in South Philadelphia throughout elementary school, where he played baseball and basketball. He played football for St. Monica's School, as Holy Spirit didn't have a program. Changing parishes during eighth grade, Eckel was able to attend and graduate Holy Spirit while playing football for The Saint Denis Bulldogs of Havertown, Pennsylvania.

Eckel then attended Episcopal Academy in Merion Station, Pennsylvania (which later moved to Newtown Square, Pennsylvania) and was a letterman in football (three years), baseball (three years), and ice hockey (one year). In football, he was a two-time first-team All-Area and All-League selection. As a senior, while team captain, he earned first-team All-City and All-Area honors as a middle linebacker. Eckel amassed nearly 3,000 rushing yards and 40 touchdowns in his high school career.

While playing baseball for the Churchmen of Episcopal Academy, Eckel recorded a .460 batting average during his junior season, earning All-League, All-City and All-Area selections. He helped the Churchmen win their first league title in 50 years. As a senior, Eckel earned similar accolades, helped the Churchmen win another league title, was selected as a member of the Carpenter Cup All-Star team, and was selected to the All-League and All-Area teams. Eckel was most recently added to Ted Silary's "30 Year Inter-AC Football All-Star" team.

Eckel attended the Naval Academy and was ranked as a preseason All-American and the top NFL fullback prospect in the country by draftboardinsider.com prior to his senior season at Navy. He was also nominated as a preseason candidate for the 2004 Doak Walker Award. He rushed for 1,147 yards and 11 touchdowns as a senior, notably rushing 26 times for a career-high 179 yards and one touchdown against Army en route to being named the Philadelphia Sportswriters Most Valuable Player of the Army-Navy game for the second consecutive year.

Eckel had 13 career 100-yard rushing games, the fourth most in school history, and became the third player in school history to twice gain 1,000 yards rushing in a season. As a junior, Eckel carried the ball 236 times for 1,249 yards and 10 touchdowns. He was named to the All-Independent team by College Football News. As a sophomore, Eckel rushed for 510 yards and four touchdowns before having his season cut short by injury. He finished his career with 2,906 rushing yards, which ranks fourth all-time at Navy, and registered 25 career rushing touchdowns, fourth in school history.

Professional career

First stint with Patriots
Eckel was signed by the New England Patriots as an undrafted free agent on April 26, 2005. He was waived by the team on September 3.

Miami Dolphins
Eckel was claimed off waivers by the Miami Dolphins and subsequently placed on the Reserve/Military list on September 7, 2005, just days after being claimed by the Dolphins.

The Dolphins received a roster exemption for Eckel after his return to the team, allowing him to practice without counting against roster limits. He was not activated during the season, and was an exclusive rights free agent in the 2007 offseason. He was re-signed to a one-year contract on March 19, 2007, but released on September 1 during final cuts.

Second stint with Patriots
Eckel was signed to the Patriots' practice squad on September 3, 2007, at a salary of $125,000, significantly higher than that season's base salary for practice squad players ($79,900).

He was promoted to the active roster on October 1 against the Cincinnati Bengals. Eckel made his regular season debut in that Monday Night Football contest, playing on special teams for much of the game, recording one tackle and getting his first carry (for three yards) in the fourth quarter. He scored his first NFL touchdown in the final minute of the Patriots' Week 6 game against the Dallas Cowboys, and a second in their Week 10 rout of the Buffalo Bills. In the Week 9 game between the undefeated Patriots and undefeated Indianapolis Colts, Eckel led all players with three special teams tackles in a Patriots 24–20 win and received special teams player of the game honors.

The Patriots released Eckel on August 26, 2008, in the first round of preseason cuts. He was re-signed to the Patriots roster on September 15, 2008, the day after their Week 2 game. The Patriots again released Eckel on September 22.

Philadelphia Eagles
Eckel was signed by his hometown Philadelphia Eagles on October 21, 2008. He played much of the season as a special teams starter and short yardage running back. Eckel was named the most valuable special teams performer in a divisional round playoff victory against the New York Giants at the Meadowlands.

New Orleans Saints
On October 29, 2009 the New Orleans Saints announced that they had signed Eckel to their roster. Eckel was primarily a fullback and special teams player on the 2009 Saints that won Super Bowl XLIV against the Indianapolis Colts, 31–17.

Denver Broncos
Eckel was signed by the Denver Broncos on June 4, 2010. He was waived/injured on June 17, and subsequently placed on injured reserve on June 21.

References

External links
New Orleans Saints bio
New England Patriots bio
Philadelphia Eagles bio

1981 births
Living people
Players of American football from Philadelphia
American football fullbacks
Navy Midshipmen football players
United States Naval Academy alumni
New England Patriots players
Miami Dolphins players
Philadelphia Eagles players
New Orleans Saints players
Denver Broncos players
Episcopal Academy alumni